Georg Höltig (26 November 1912 – 24 December 1991) was a German equestrian. He competed in two events at the 1952 Summer Olympics.

References

External links
 

1912 births
1991 deaths
German male equestrians
Olympic equestrians of Germany
Equestrians at the 1952 Summer Olympics
Sportspeople from Lower Saxony